Hospital Universitario Virgen del Rocío is the name of the complex of hospitals located in the center of Sevilla (Andalusia), and one of the most important hospitals in the South of Spain, being the biggest hospital in the region. It is managed by the public company "Servicio Andaluz de Salud". HUVR is considered one of the best hospitals in Spain.

HUVR is one of the regional hospitals of Andalusia, and counts over 8.000 professionals, 54 surgery rooms, 1.291 beds and 450 clinical consultation rooms. It is also affiliated to the University of Seville, being one of the main practical centers for health-care studies.

The complex includes the following hospitals: 
 General Hospital 
 Traumatology and Rehabilitation Hospital 
 Birth and Pediatrics Hospital
 "Duques del Infantado" Hospital

It is famous for being the second Hospital in Spain to perform a successful face transplantation, in 2010.

History 
The construction of the hospital began in the 50s, being finally opened in 1955, meaning an important improvement on the state of health care in the province. Its initial name was Residencia Sanitaria García Morato, which was used until the 70s.

The initial design counted only with one main building (nowadays the General Hospital), and was mainly used for surgery proceedings. By the 60s, the management was restructured, dividing the hospital in departments, and a new building was inaugurated in the complex, nowadays the Rehabilitation and Traumatology Hospital, followed by the Birth and Pediatrics Hospital.

Later on, the hospital has incorporated the Regional Center for Blood Transfusions, the female school for nursering (now extinct), the Diagnosticsand Treatment Center and the Pabillion of Pathologic Anatomy. In the 80s, the hospital transferred it management to the regional government (Junta de Andalucia) and signed a collaboration with the University of Seville, obtaining from then on the denomination of "University Hospital".

Area of Influence 
The complex is cataloged as a regional hospital, that is, a third level center which offers the medical specialties included in the Spanish Healthcare System.

Its influence area extends through the western side of Andalusia (provinces of Seville and Huelva), which adds around 550.000 inhabitants. The hospital hosts over 8.000 different professionals, with a budget of 516.831.000 euros. In a year, it averages, among others, 50.000 hospitalizations, 300.000 consultations of emergency medicine, 47.000 surgeries, 1.160.000 external consultations, 6.000 births and 280 transplants.

Associated Centers

Research and Medical Specialties 
The hospital Virgen del Rocio is known for the quality of its research, both inside and outside of Spain. In fact, the Biomedical Research Institute of Seville is managed by the same complex, so that professionals can participate and manage biomedical research projects found in their consultations, easing the transference of research.

Professionals working at the HUVR participate are also part of different excellence efforts, like the European Research Network (ERN), the Reference Centers, Services and Units (CSUR) and the Reference Services in the Andalusian Public Health System (Servicios de Referencia en el Sistema Sanitario Público de Andalucía) 
 working on different projects.

European Research Network (ERN) 
 Rare Neuromuscular Diseases European Reference Network
 European Paediatric Oncology Reference Network for Diagnosticos and Treatment (EPO-r-NeT)
 Neuroblastoma
 Rare cancers: Sarcomas and other musculoskeletal tumors both in infants and adults

Reference Centers, Services and Units (CSUR) 
 Critical burns
 Infant kidney transplant
 Pelvic osteotomy in adult hip dysplasia
 Resistant osteoarticular infections' treatment 
 Infant orthopedics
 Infant allogeneic hematopoietic progenitor transplant
 Reimplantation, including the catastrophic hand
 Cross kidney transplant
 Brachial plexus surgery
 Rare diseases that occur with movement disorders
 Rare Neuromuscular Diseases
 Sarcoma in childhood
 Sarcoma and other musculoskeletal tumors in adults
 Neuroblastoma
 Rare Neuromuscular Diseases
 Renal tumors with vascular involvement (pending resolution)
 Germinal tumors of high and intermediate risk and resistant to first-line chemotherapy in adults (pending resolution)
 Serious Kidney Disease and treatment with dialysis (pending audit)
 Congenital Metabolic Diseases (pending audit)

Reference Services in the Andalusian Public Health System
 Cross kidney transplant
 Kidney transplant from living donor and cadaver
 Liver transplant from cadaver donor
 Adult heart transplant
 Reference laboratory for the molecular study in tuberculosis
 Bladder Exstrophy and Epispadias
 Acute and chronic porphyrias
 Amyotrophic Lateral Sclerosis
 Cystic fibrosis
 Endothelial lamellar keratoplasty (DSAEK)
 Laboratory of metabolopathies. Neonatal screening
 Complex fetal medicine
 Preimplantation Genetic Diagnosis
 Branchial plexus surgery
 Child Orthopedics
 Pelvic osteotome in adult hip dysplasias
 Treatment of resistant osteoarticular infections
 Critical burns
 Reimplantation unit including the catastrophic hand
 Transplantation of allogeneic hematopoietic progenitors infantile
 Neuroblastoma
 Rare diseases that deal with movement disorders
 Kidney transplant in underweight children

Teaching 
The HUVR has an agreement with the University of Seville, to improve the knowledge both in experimental and empirical science, and the formation of its professionals (Diagnosis, prognosis, therapy and practical abilities).

The undergraduate activity at the University Hospital adds up to:
 Teachers in the Faculty of Medicine: 81
 Professors of the Faculty of Nursing, Physiotherapy and Podiatry: 31
 Students Degree of Medicine: 558
 Students Degree of Nursing: 230
 Students Degree of Physiotherapy: 174

Regarding postgraduate training, the data are as follows:
 Residential Resident Specialist Tutors: 152
 Accredited places: 178 and offered: 121
 Resident Internal Specialists: 466

Notes

References 

Hospitals in Andalusia
Teaching hospitals in Spain
Buildings and structures in Seville